Zortanlu(also Romanized as Zartānlū and Zortānlū; also known as Şūfīānlū and Zartanu) is a village in Sivkanlu Rural District, in the Central District of Shirvan County, North Khorasan Province, Iran. At the 2006 census, its population was 392, in 99 families.

References 

Populated places in Shirvan County